The following lists events that happened during 1924 in the Colony of Southern Rhodesia.

Incumbents
 Prime Minister: Charles Coghlan

Events

April
 29 April - The Southern Rhodesia general election takes place and Charles Coghlan of the Rhodesia Party becomes the first Prime Minister of Southern Rhodesia.

References 

 
Years of the 20th century in Southern Rhodesia
Southern Rhodesia
Southern Rhodesia
1920s in Southern Rhodesia